"The Reflex" is the eleventh single by English new wave band Duran Duran, released in 1984. The song was heavily remixed for single release and was the third and last to be taken from their third studio album Seven and the Ragged Tiger (1983). The single became the band's first to reach the top of the US singles chart and their second to top the UK singles chart.

Song history
"The Reflex" became the band's most successful single, topping the UK chart on 5 May 1984. It was their second UK No. 1, after 1983's "Is There Something I Should Know?", and would prove to be their last. The single entered the charts in America on 21 April 1984 at no. 46, became Duran Duran's first of two singles to hit no. 1 on the US Billboard Hot 100 (for 2 weeks) on 23 June 1984 (see 1984 in music), and was a huge hit internationally. (Their only other single to hit no. 1 in the US was the title song to the 1985 James Bond film "A View to a Kill".) It was also the first of two songs that kept "Dancing in the Dark" by Bruce Springsteen out of the top spot (the other one being Prince's "When Doves Cry"). The band wanted it to be the lead single from Seven and the Ragged Tiger (1983), but their label did not like the warbling singing during the "why don't you use it" segments, thinking this would hinder its success as a stand-alone single track.

The remixes for both the 7" and 12" singles were created by Nile Rodgers, of Chic fame. It was his first work with the band, and he would later go on to produce "The Wild Boys" single as well as the album Notorious (1986) and several tracks on Astronaut (2004).

Producer Ian Little recalled the sound Nick Rhodes came up with on his Roland Jupiter-8 keyboard: "...whenever I hear that steel-drum part it always brings a smile to my face because it's so out of tune. Steel drums always are, but it was exactly right in terms of rhythm and tone. So a wood-block sound was mixed in to make it even more percussive and, successfully, it did the job."

Critical reception
Cash Box said that "spotlighting the slick vocals of Simon Le Bon and the tight Euro-pop rhythms set to a funk beat, 'The Reflex' will certainly cause a stir for current fans and it will probably reach a new, more dance oriented crowd."

Music video
Main photography of the music video for "The Reflex" took place during the Seven and the Ragged Tiger tour at Maple Leaf Gardens in Toronto, Ontario on 5 March 1984. Director Russell Mulcahy filmed some of the close-up footage in the indoor arena that afternoon, and the band's performance was filmed live during that evening's concert.

"The Reflex" is primarily a concert video, accurately portraying Duran Duran's Sing Blue Silver tour performance style. However, in keeping with the band's insistence that their music videos "never be ordinary", the video screen above the stage displayed bits of naked models wearing collars and chains illuminated with black light, occasionally interrupted by computerized video white noise. At one point, a computer graphics generated waterfall appears to pour out of the video screen above the stage to soak the audience.

Keyboard enthusiasts have taken note of the Fairlight CMI (the first digital sampling synthesiser) that Nick Rhodes operated with a light pen in this video, and throughout the tour.

Some symbolic scenes from the official video were taken and later mixed with the alternate version shown in the band's concert film Arena (An Absurd Notion) (1985); in the final segment when the band, the crowd and even the fans undertake the final and crucial battle against the evil Dr. Durand Durand.

B-sides, bonus tracks and remixes
In addition to the 4:26 single remix, the 12" also included an extended remix of "The Reflex". The live B-side "Make Me Smile (Come Up and See Me)" is a cover version of a Steve Harley & Cockney Rebel song, recorded 16 November 1982 at Hammersmith Odeon in London, with lead Rebel Steve Harley joining the band onstage.

A second live B-side released on the US single, "New Religion", was recorded 7 February 1984 at The Forum in Los Angeles. This is not the same live version that appears on the album Arena (1984).

Formats and track listing

7": EMI. / Duran 2 United Kingdom
"The Reflex" – 4:20
"Make Me Smile" (Come Up and See Me) (Live) – 4:54 (Recorded live at Hammersmith Odeon London, 16 November 1982)

12": EMI. / 12 Duran 2 United Kingdom
"The Reflex" (Dance Mix) – 6:35
"The Reflex" [7" version] – 4:20
"Make Me Smile" (Come Up and See Me) (Live) – 4:54 (Recorded live at Hammersmith Odeon London, 16 November 1982)

7": Capitol Records. / B-5345 United States
"The Reflex" (The Dance Mix-Edited) – 4:25
"New Religion" (Live in L.A.) – 4:52 (Recorded live at The Forum Los Angeles, 7 February 1984) 
The Dance Mix-Edited is the same version as the regular 7".

12": Capitol Records. / V-8587 United States
"The Reflex" (Dance Mix) – 6:35
"The Reflex" (The Dance Mix-Edited) – 4:25
The Dance Mix-Edited is the same version as the regular 7".

CD: Part of Singles Box Set 1981–1985 box set
"The Reflex" – 4:20
"Make Me Smile" (Come Up and See Me) (Live) – 4:54 (Recorded live at Hammersmith Odeon London, 16 November 1982)
"The Reflex (Dance Mix)" – 6:35

Charts and certifications

Weekly charts

Year-end charts

Certifications and sales

As of October 2021 "The Reflex" is the fourth most streamed Duran Duran song in the UK.

Cover versions
Cover versions have been recorded by Less Than Jake and the duo of Kylie Minogue and Ben Lee.

Media references
A chain of 1980s-themed nightclubs in the UK is named after the song. The Birmingham branch is located directly opposite the former site of the Rum Runner, Duran Duran's early home base. American stand-up comedian Dave Chappelle sings an excerpt from the song during a "Stereotype Pixies" sketch from Chappelle's Show.

The song is featured in the sixth episode of the sixth season of Better Call Saul, Axe and Grind.

See also
List of Billboard Hot 100 number-one singles of 1984
List of Cash Box Top 100 number-one singles of 1984
List of Dutch Top 40 number-one singles of 1984
List of European number-one hits of 1984
List of number-one singles of 1984 (Ireland)
List of UK Singles Chart number ones of the 1980s

References

External links
 

1983 songs
1984 singles
Billboard Hot 100 number-one singles
Capitol Records singles
Cashbox number-one singles
Duran Duran songs
Dutch Top 40 number-one singles
EMI Records singles
European Hot 100 Singles number-one singles
Irish Singles Chart number-one singles
Music videos directed by Russell Mulcahy
Song recordings produced by Nile Rodgers
Songs written by Simon Le Bon
Songs written by Nick Rhodes
Songs written by Andy Taylor (guitarist)
Songs written by John Taylor (bass guitarist)
Songs written by Roger Taylor (Duran Duran drummer)
UK Singles Chart number-one singles
Ultratop 50 Singles (Flanders) number-one singles